Sophie Evans may refer to:

 Sophie Evans (performer) (born 1993), Welsh singer, actress and talent show contestant
 Sophie Evans (magician), English magician
 Sophie Evans (actress) (born 1976), Hungarian pornographic actress